This is a list of department stores that were located in Downtown Los Angeles, part of the History of Retail in Southern California

aas Macy's
References

Department stores, Los Angeles
department stores
History of Los Angeles
Broadway (Los Angeles)
History of retail in the United States